Aylesbury Vale District Council was the council for the non-metropolitan district of Aylesbury Vale in Buckinghamshire, England, which existed as a local government area from 1974 to 2020. The council was elected every four years from 1973 until 2020. At the time of its abolition, the council had 59 councillors, elected from 33 wards.

Political control
From the first election to the council in 1973 until its merger into Buckinghamshire Council in 2020, political control of the council was held by the following parties:

Leadership
Following the Local Government Act 2000, political leadership was provided by the leader of the council. The leaders of Aylesbury Vale District Council from 2001 until its abolition in 2020 were:

Council elections
Summary of the council composition after each council election, click on the year for full details of each election.

District result maps

By-election results
By-elections occur when seats become vacant between council elections. Below is a summary of recent by-elections; full by-election results can be found by clicking on the by-election name.

1995-1999

1999-2003

2003-2007

2007-2011

2011-2015

2015-present

References

External links
Aylesbury Vale Council

 
Aylesbury Vale
Council elections in Buckinghamshire
District council elections in England